Poetic closure is the sense of conclusion given at the end of a poem.  Barbara Herrnstein Smith's detailed study—Poetic Closure: A Study of How Poems End—explores various techniques for achieving closure. One of the most common techniques is setting up a regular pattern and then breaking it to mark the end of a poem.  Another technique is to refer to subject matter that in itself provides a sense of closure: death is the clearest example of this.

Further reading
 Barbara Herrnstein Smith: Poetic Closure: A Study of How Poems End, University of Chicago Press 1968. 
 D.H. Roberts, F.M. Dunn, D. P. Fowler: Classical Closure: Reading the End in Greek and Latin Literature. Princeton 1997.
 Vincent, John Emil. Queer Lyrics: Difficulty and Closure in American Poetry. Palgrave 2002. 

Poetic forms